Feel It is the debut album by Philadelphia-based Fat Larry's Band.

Track listing
"Feel It" - (Larry James, Ronnie Walker, Vincent Montana, Jr.)  5:14
"Nighttime Boogie" - (Erskine Williams, Larry James, Larry M. LaBes, Ted Cohen)  5:17
"Down on the Avenue" - (Charles Kelly, Larry James, Larry M. LaBes)  5:18
"Music Maker" - (Larry James, Larry M. LaBes, Ted Cohen, William Kimes)  3:43
"Center City" - (Doris Hall, Larry James, Ronnie Walker, Vincent Montana, Jr.)  3:38
"Fascination" - (David Bowie, Luther Vandross)  6:55
"Life of an Entertainer" - (Charles Kelly, Erskine Williams, Larry James)  4:41
"We Just Want to Play for You" - (C. Gunner, Larry James, Larry M. LaBes)  5:15

Personnel
Larry James - Drums, Vocals
Larry LaBes - Bass, Vocals
Erskine Williams - Keyboards, Vocals
Ted Cohen - Guitar, Vocals
Dennis Locantore - Bass
Ronnie James, Ronnie Walker - Guitar
Dennis Henderson - Timbales
James Walker - Congas, Timbales
Darryl Grant - Percussion, Vocals
Greg Moore - Congas
John Bonnie - Alto Saxophone
Doug Khalif Jones - Alto, Soprano, Tenor Saxophone, Vocals
Jimmy Lee - Trombone, Alto Saxophone, Vocals
Art Capehart - Trumpet, Flute, Vocals
Chestine Murph, Joan Hanson, Mharlyn Merrit - Backing Vocals arranged by Doris Hall

References

External links
 Fat Larry's Band-Feel It at Discogs

1976 debut albums
Albums recorded at Sigma Sound Studios